Santosh Meena (born 1 June 1966) is an Indian politician. He is the Director of BCCB and has been nominated for authorised member of Madhya Pradesh Cooperatives bank. He is the BJP district convener of Bhopal 

Santosh Meena was born in the village of Pipaliya Bajkhan in Bhopal district, Madhya Pradesh. His father's name is late Shri Roopram Meena. His educational qualification is BA. LL.B. He is District Convener in the Bharatiya Janata Party governed Indian state of Madhya Pradesh. He Comes From Meena Community.

References

1966 births
Living people
Bharatiya Janata Party politicians from Madhya Pradesh
21st-century Indian politicians